The Barbary Coast (also Barbary, Berbery or Berber Coast) was the name given to the coastal regions of North Africa or Maghreb, specifically the Ottoman borderlands consisting of the regencies in Algiers and Tripoli, as well as the Beylik of Tunis and the Sultanate of Morocco from the 16th to 19th centuries. The term originates from the exonym of the Berbers.

History

Barbary was not always a unified political entity. From the 16th century onwards, it was divided into the political entities of the Regency of Algiers, Tripolitania, Beylik of Tunis, and Sharifan Empire. Major rulers and petty monarchs during the times of the Barbary States' plundering parties included the Dey of Algiers, the Pasha of Tripoli, the Bey of Tunis, and the Sultan of Morocco.

In 1625, Algiers' pirate fleet (by far the largest) numbered 100 ships of various sizes employing 8,000 to 10,000 men. The corsair industry accounted for 25 percent of the workforce of the city, not counting other activities related directly to the port. The fleet averaged 25 ships in the 1680s, but these were larger vessels than had been used since the 1620s, thus the fleet still employed some 7,000 men. In addition 2,500 men manned the pirate fleet of Tripoli, 3,000 in Tunis, and several thousand more in all the various minor pirate bases such as Bona, Susa, Bizerta, and Salé. The corsairs were not solely natives of their cities; while many were Arabs and Berbers, there were also Turks, Greeks, Albanians, Syrians, and renegade Italians (especially Corsicans) among their number.Gregory Hanlon. "The Twilight Of A Military Tradition: Italian Aristocrats And European Conflicts, 1560-1800." Routledge: 1997. Pages 27-28.

The first military land action overseas by the United States was executed by the US Marines and the US Navy in 1805 at the Battle of Derna, Tripoli, a coastal town now in eastern Libya, in April 1805. It formed part of an effort to destroy all Barbary pirates, to reclaim American slaves in captivity and end piracy acts between the warring tribes on the part of the Barbary states, which were themselves member states of the Ottoman Empire. The opening line of the Marines' Hymn refers to this action: "From the halls of Montezuma to the shores of Tripoli...".

See also

References

Sources

 
 LAFI (Nora), Une ville du Maghreb entre ancien régime et réformes ottomanes. Genèse des institutions municipales à Tripoli de Barbarie (1795–1911), Paris: L'Harmattan, 2002, p. 305

External links

"When Europeans Were Slaves: Research Suggests White Slavery Was Much More Common Than Previously Believed", Ohio State University

 
Barbary Wars
Berber history
Coasts of Africa
Historical regions
Ottoman Algeria
History of Libya
History of Morocco
History of Tunisia
North Africa
Regions of Africa
Eurocentrism